Ron Oliver is a Canadian writer, director, producer, and actor who started with the cult hit Hello Mary Lou: Prom Night II.  He was also a host on Canada's YTV for the shows YTV Hits, The Ron Oliver Show, Oliver's Twist & Rock 'n Talk.  He has gone on to direct various television and motion picture scripts.  He has been nominated twice for the Directors Guild of America Award. Oliver directed several episodes of both Are You Afraid of the Dark? and Goosebumps.

He received an Emmy nomination for producing the NBC children's series Scout's Safari filmed on location in South Africa. In 2007 he directed the direct-to-video film A Dennis the Menace Christmas. In 2010 Oliver directed the Disney Channel film Harriet the Spy: Blog Wars.

References

External links

Canadian film directors
Canadian male screenwriters
Canadian television directors
Canadian television producers
Canadian television writers
Living people
Place of birth missing (living people)
Year of birth missing (living people)
20th-century Canadian screenwriters
20th-century Canadian male writers
21st-century Canadian screenwriters
21st-century Canadian male writers